DFJ Frontier is an American venture capital firm with offices in Los Angeles, Sacramento, and Santa Barbara, California as well as Portland, Oregon. The firm invests in seed and early-stage technology companies on the West Coast, initially funding companies with between $100,000 and $1 million. The firm has approximately $80 million under management in two funds, DFJ Frontier Fund I, LP ($25.6 million, 2003 vintage) and DFJ Frontier Fund II, LP ($55.4 million, 2007 vintage). DFJ Frontier typically leads the first round of investment, with one of its partners serving on the board of the portfolio company.

DFJ Frontier is a network partner of the DFJ Network and Draper Fisher Jurvetson. DFJ is based in Menlo Park, California with affiliate offices in more than 30 cities around the world and over $5 billion in capital commitments. These 17 individually structured venture capital firms form a network with over 150 investment professionals. Notable DFJ Network investments include AdMob (acquired by Google), Baidu, Hotmail (acquired by Microsoft), Overture (acquired by Yahoo), Skype (acquired by eBay), and MaxPreps (acquired by CBS Sports).

DFJ Frontier was founded in 2002 by Managing Directors David Cremin and Scott Lenet, former entrepreneurs and venture capitalists. Frank Foster joined as a venture partner in 2003, becoming a managing director in 2007. The firm's venture partners include Jim Schraith, Oleg Kaganovich, Brian Danella, Eric Rosenfeld, and Tony Perkins.

Investment Criteria 

Stage: DFJ Frontier invests in seed (yet to complete product development) and early-stage (product development complete, may have launched) companies.

Geography: DFJ Frontier invests in companies on the west coast of the United States.

Industry Sector: Information technology, internet, media, life sciences, and other.

Business Model Characteristics: DFJ Frontier favors investments with recurring revenue characteristics, defensibility from competition, and extensibility into new markets, products, and geographies.

Entrepreneurial Education 

The partners at DFJ Frontier have developed a curriculum to teach entrepreneurship and venture capital to MBAs, PhDs, post-doctoral students, and undergraduates. DFJ Frontier investment professionals have served as adjunct professors at UC Davis, UC Santa Barbara, Cal Poly San Luis Obispo, and University of Southern California; and co-founded the Center for Entrepreneurship at UC Davis. The firm has run entrepreneurship academies or guest lectured at Stanford University, Harvard University, The Wharton School of the University of Pennsylvania, UCLA, University of Michigan, Portland State University, University of Oregon, Oregon State University, Oregon Health & Science University, University of Edinburgh, Royal Institute of Technology (Stockholm, Sweden), CSU Fresno, CSU Sacramento, and Humboldt State University.

The firm's professionals author a byline called "Something Ventured" to educate entrepreneurs about venture capital. The column has appeared in the Sacramento Business Journal.

Portfolio 
DFJ Frontier has provided venture capital for the following companies:

References 

Financial services companies established in 2002
Venture capital firms of the United States
Companies based in Los Angeles